MeteoGalicia is the regional meteorological agency for Galicia, Spain. It was founded in 2000 following an agreement between the then Ministry of the Environment - now known as the Ministry of the Environment, Territory and Infrastructures - and the University of Santiago de Compostela.

MeteoGalicia is divided into four departments: Operative weather forecast, Numerical weather forecast, Meteorological visualization and Climatology.

References

External links
 MeteoGalicia
 O Tempo. iPhone App

Governmental meteorological agencies in Europe
Research institutes in Galicia, Spain